Christian Synaeghel (born 28 January 1951 in Leffrinckoucke) is a French retired professional football midfielder.

External links
Profile at French federation official site

1951 births
Living people
French footballers
France international footballers
Association football midfielders
AS Saint-Étienne players
FC Metz players
Ligue 1 players